The black-fronted ground tyrant (Muscisaxicola frontalis) is a species of bird in the family Tyrannidae.
It breeds in the southern Andes and winters north, reaching southern Peru.
Its natural habitat is subtropical or tropical high-altitude grassland.

References

black-fronted ground tyrant
Birds of the Southern Andes
black-fronted ground tyrant
Taxonomy articles created by Polbot